Lakshadhikari is a 1963 Indian Telugu-language thriller film directed by V. Madhusudhana Rao. The film stars N. T. Rama Rao and Krishna Kumari, with V. Nagayya, Gummadi, Relangi, Ramana Reddy, Mikkilineni, K. V. S. Sarma, Suryakantham, Girija and Rushyendramani in supporting roles. It is the debut production of Tammareddy Krishna Murthy and D. Venkatapathi Reddy's company Ravindra Art Pictures. It was released on 27 September 1963, and became a commercial success.

Plot 
Rangayya is a millionaire, whose loyal and trusted manager is Seethayya. Seethayya's wife Lakshmi takes care of Rangayya's motherless son. Rangayya's brother-in-law, the greedy Sivam, frames Rangayya for murder, has him sent to prison for 20 years, and kidnaps his son. But the boy is saved by a childless couple Pichayya and Achamma, who found him unconscious on the river bed and raise him as Prasad. Later, Achamma gives birth to a daughter, Leela.

Seethayya's daughter Padma falls in love with Prasad. Seethayya offers Prasad a high-ranking position in his pharmaceutical company. Rangayya is released upon completing his prison term. Prasad learns the truth about his parentage. Strange things happen, which Prasad suspects are centered around Seethayya's house. With help from Padma and S. S. Rao (the servant Panakalu's son), he solves the mystery and exposes Seethayya as the real culprit for the wrong deeds.

Cast 
N. T. Rama Rao as Prasad
Krishna Kumari as Padma
V. Nagayya as Rangayya
Gummadi as Seethayya
Relangi as S. S. Rao
Ramana Reddy as Pichayya
Mikkilineni as Panakalu
K. V. S. Sarma as Sivam
Suryakantham as Achamma
Girija as Leela
Rushyendramani as Lakshmi

Production

Development 
After working as a production controller at Sarathi Studios for years, Tammareddy Krishna Murthy established his own production company Ravindra Art Pictures (named after the poet Rabindranath Tagore) with his friend D. Venkatapathi Reddy as partner. For the company's debut production, which would eventually become Lakshadhikari, Krishna Murthy signed V. Madhusudhana Rao to direct and Narla Chiranjeevi as writer.

The original story was simply a family drama, which did not fully satisfy Krishna Murthy. When Krishna Murthy met producer Parvathaneni Gangadhara Rao, the latter advised him to include an element of suspense in the story, and Krishna Murthy liked the idea. Heeding to Krishna Murthy's wishes, Narla Chiranjeevi rewrote the story to make it look more like a thriller. Cinematography was handled by C. Nageswara Rao, and the editing by Akkineni Sanjeeva Rao.

Casting and filming 
N. T. Rama Rao was cast as the male lead Prasad; the fact that he and Krishna Murthy bonded during the making of Palletooru (1952), which was Krishna Murthy's cinematic debut as production manager, helped him get Rama Rao's dates for Lakshadhikari. Krishna Murthy initially chose Nagabhushanam to play the character Seethayya, but later replaced him with Gummadi as he felt he could "conceal villainy behind his soft demeanour and mislead the audience."

One scene filmed at the swimming pool of the College of Engineering, Guindy had Padma (Krishna Kumari) in a swimsuit, but it was edited out by the Censor Board who declared that "the heroine should not wear a swim suit". The exterior portions of Chandamama Buildings in Vadapalani stood in for the college where Padma and Leela (Girija) study. The end of the song "Mabbulo Yemundi" required that Rama Rao and Krishna Kumari walk holding each other's hands on the seashore. As they were walking, a giant wave swept them away. Krishna Kumari did not know swimming and almost drowned, but Rama Rao held her hand tightly and saved her. Peketi Sivaram created the film's revolver sound effects.

Soundtrack 
The soundtrack was composed by T. Chalapathi Rao.

Release and reception 
Lakshadhikari was released on 27 September 1963. The film performed well at the box office, and became a trendsetter for more suspense-filled films in Telugu.

Notes

References

External links 
 

1960s Telugu-language films
1960s thriller films
1963 films
Films directed by V. Madhusudhana Rao
Films scored by T. Chalapathi Rao
Indian black-and-white films
Indian thriller films